Nichlas Torp (born April 10, 1989 in Jönköping) is a Swedish ice hockey player. He is currently playing with HV71 in the Swedish Hockey League (SHL). He was drafted by the Montreal Canadiens in the sixth round of the 2007 NHL Entry Draft, 163rd overall.

Playing career 
Torp made his debut in the Swedish Hockey League (SHL) representing his hometown team HV71 during the 2008-09 season. In 2010, he helped the team win the Swedish national championship. He moved to Timrå IK in 2011, where he spent one year, followed by a four-year tenure at Modo Hockey.

The 2016-17 season saw him skate for Leksands IF, before taking his game abroad for the first time in his career, when putting pen to paper on a deal with the Nürnberg Ice Tigers of the German DEL on February 6, 2017.

References

External links

1989 births
Living people
Düsseldorfer EG players
HV71 players
Leksands IF players
Malmö Redhawks players
Modo Hockey players
Montreal Canadiens draft picks
IK Oskarshamn players
Swedish ice hockey defencemen
Thomas Sabo Ice Tigers players
Timrå IK players
People from Jönköping
Sportspeople from Jönköping County